Laurie John Evans (born 12 October 1987) is an English cricketer, contracted to Surrey County Cricket Club. A right-handed top-order batsman, he has previously represented Warwickshire, Northamptonshire and Sussex in county cricket, and since 2019 has been selected for global Twenty20 leagues, representing Rajshahi Kings, Multan Sultans, St Kitts & Nevis Patriots, Colombo Kings and the Perth Scorchers.

Career
Evans was born in Lambeth in London and educated at The John Fisher School and Whitgift School. He attended Durham University, where he played first-class cricket for Durham MCC University. He played three first-class games for Durham UCCE in 2007, and one first-class game for the Marylebone Cricket Club (MCC) against the touring West Indies later that summer.

Evans graduated from Surrey County Cricket Club Academy in 2007. He made his first-class debut for the club in April 2009 in a County Championship Division Two match against Gloucestershire at The Oval. He was selected for the following match at Derbyshire, and made two further appearances later in the campaign, his Twenty20 debut in June and List A debut in August.

Having only played two Championship games and a single one-day match in the 2010 season, Evans was released by Surrey at the end of the campaign. He signed for Warwickshire later that year.

With Tim Ambrose, Evans set a new Warwickshire county record for a sixth wicket partnership on 1 July 2015.  The pair added 327 against Sussex in the County Championship at Birmingham.

In August 2016 Evans moved to Northamptonshire on a one-month-long loan. In December 2016, Evans signed for Sussex.

In September 2018, Evans was named in Kabul's squad in the first edition of the Afghanistan Premier League tournament. The following month, he was named in the squad for the Rajshahi Kings team, following the draft for the 2018–19 Bangladesh Premier League. He was the leading run-scorer for the Kings in the tournament, with 339 runs in eleven matches. In November 2019, he was selected to play for the Dhaka Platoon in the 2019–20 Bangladesh Premier League.

On 29 May 2020, Evans was named in a 55-man group of players to begin training ahead of international fixtures starting in England following the COVID-19 pandemic. On 9 July 2020, Evans was included in England's 24-man squad to start training behind closed doors for the One Day International (ODI) series against Ireland.

On 7 August 2020, Evans re-joined Surrey on a week-long loan to play in the 2020 Bob Willis Trophy match against Essex. The loan was extended for the following match and the next week Surrey announced that Evans had signed a two-year contract with the club. Sussex initially stated that he would return to their side for the 2020 T20 Blast before taking up his contract with Surrey at the end of the season. However, Sussex subsequently announced that Evans had expressed his desire to join Surrey immediately, with both clubs issuing statements that said Evans would be joining his new club on loan for the remainder of the season - but would not be able to play in any matches against his former side - before moving permanently at the end of the campaign.

He is the nephew of Olympic rower, Greg Searle.

In April 2022, he was bought by the Manchester Originals for the 2022 season of The Hundred.

References

External links

1987 births
Living people
People from Lambeth
Alumni of St Mary's College, Durham
People educated at Whitgift School
English cricketers
English cricketers of the 21st century
Colombo Stars cricketers
Dhaka Dominators cricketers
Durham MCCU cricketers
Kabul Zwanan cricketers
Marylebone Cricket Club cricketers
Multan Sultans cricketers
Northamptonshire cricketers
North v South cricketers
Oval Invincibles cricketers
Perth Scorchers cricketers
Rajshahi Royals cricketers
St Kitts and Nevis Patriots cricketers
Surrey cricketers
Sussex cricketers
Warwickshire cricketers
Manchester Originals cricketers